This list of advertising awards is an index to articles about notable awards given to the advertising industry. The list is organized by the home country of the sponsor, although most awards are not limited to one country. The list is restricted to the advertising industry, as opposed to trade organizations, film and music festivals, and so on where the awards may be considered to have some advertising value.

See also

 Gunn Report: annual publication identifying and detailing the most awarded new work within the advertising industry.
 List of business and industry awards
 Lists of awards

References

 
Advertising